The 1979 Northwestern Wildcats team represented Northwestern University during the 1979 Big Ten Conference football season. In their second year under head coach Rick Venturi, the Wildcats compiled a 1–10 record (0–9 against Big Ten Conference opponents) and finished in last place in the Big Ten Conference.

The team's offensive leaders were quarterback Mike Kerrigan with 961 passing yards, Jeff Cohn with 426 rushing yards, and Todd Sheets with 614 receiving yards.

Northwestern's 21–54 loss to Syracuse on September 22 began what would eventually become a 34-game losing streak, the longest in FBS history. They wouldn't win another game until September 25, 1982.

Schedule

Roster

Team players in the NFL

References

Northwestern
Northwestern Wildcats football seasons
Northwestern Wildcats football